Super Mario RPG: Legend of the Seven Stars is a role-playing video game developed by Square and published by Nintendo for the Super Nintendo Entertainment System in 1996. It was the final Mario game published for the SNES. The game was directed by Chihiro Fujioka and Yoshihiko Maekawa, produced by Mario creator Shigeru Miyamoto, and scored by Yoko Shimomura.

Super Mario RPG story focuses on Mario and his friends as they seek to defeat Smithy, who has crashed into their world and stolen the seven star pieces of Star Road. Super Mario RPG is the first RPG in the Mario franchise, drawing from major elements of Square's RPG franchises such as Final Fantasy. The main form of fighting enemies is turn-based combat with a party of up to three characters. It is also the first game in the Mario franchise to have gameplay within an isometric 3D environment, allowing for a new variety of the exploration and platforming elements reminiscent of the Super Mario series.

Super Mario RPG was critically acclaimed, and particularly praised for its humor and 3D-rendered graphics. It was the inspiration for Nintendo's other role-playing series, Paper Mario and Mario & Luigi, and both are spiritual successors which retain some gameplay elements. Super Mario RPG was released on the Wii Virtual Console service in 2008, marking its debut in Europe and Australia, and later for the Wii U's Virtual Console in 2015. It was also included with the Super NES Classic Edition in 2017.

Gameplay 

Super Mario RPG contains token similarities to other Square-developed video games, such as the Final Fantasy series, along with a story and gameplay based on the Super Mario Bros. series of platform games. Like most traditional JRPGs, the two main sections of the game are adventuring and turn-based battle sequences. Much of Super Mario RPGs gameplay is outside monster battles and plays like an isometric 3D platformer, in which traditional Mario elements such as punching floating question blocks from below are prominent. There are no random encounters and as such enemies are visible in the field; a battle ensues only if Mario comes in contact with one. This allows the player to evade unnecessary battles.

The player's party initially begins with only Mario and grows to five characters. Mario and up to two other members participate in battles, who can be swapped in and out while the player explores the overworld. Each of the five characters has a unique set of attacks and techniques. For example, Princess Toadstool's abilities are primarily healing techniques, whereas Geno and Bowser have offensive attacks that deal high amounts of damage. The combat is based on a traditional turn-based battle system with the addition of action commands that amplify a move's effects. The player starts each turn by choosing to attack, defend, run, use an item, or perform magic from the combat menu. The action command consists of timed button presses during an attack, special move, defense, or item usage, which became a mainstay of later Mario RPGs.

Plot

Characters and setting 
The game world is set in a geographically diverse land, which includes mountains, forests, and bodies of water. Each region has distinct characteristics held by its inhabitants; Mushroom Kingdom is inhabited by Toads, Moleville is inhabited by moles, Monstro Town is populated by reformed monsters, Yo'ster Isle is where Yoshi and his eponymous species reside, and Nimbus Land is an area inhabited by cloud people. Bowser's Castle is another prominent location in the game, as it holds the portal to the main antagonist's homeworld.

As in most Super Mario games, the main protagonist is Mario, whose initial goal is to rescue Princess Toadstool from Bowser. Soon after the start of his journey, the Smithy Gang invades the world. While attempting to stop the group, Mario is joined by Mallow, a cloud boy who thinks he is a tadpole; Geno, a doll possessed by a celestial spirit from the Star Road; Bowser, whose armies have deserted him out of fear of the Smithy Gang; and Princess Toadstool, who was lost in the turmoil that occurred when the Smithy Gang arrived. The Smithy Gang is led by Smithy, a robotic blacksmith from an alternate dimension with aspirations of world domination.

Story 
Mario sets out to rescue Princess Toadstool, infiltrating the castle to which she has been taken and challenging kidnapper King Bowser. During the battle, a giant living sword named Exor falls from the sky, breaks through the Star Road (a pathway that helps grant people's wishes), and crashes into Bowser's castle, sending Mario, Princess Toadstool, and Bowser flying in different directions, as well as scattering the seven-star fragments. Mario lands back at his pad and meets up with Toad, who tells him he has to rescue Toadstool. Mario returns to Bowser's castle, but Exor destroys the bridge, preventing him from entering. Mario makes his way to the Mushroom Kingdom, where Mario encounters a "tadpole" named Mallow who has set out to retrieve a frog coin taken by the local thief Croco. After Mario helps him retrieve the frog coin, they return to the Mushroom Kingdom to find that it is overrun by the Smithy Gang, followers of the evil robotic blacksmith king named Smithy. Mario and Mallow enter the castle to defeat gang boss Mack, and subsequently find a mysterious Star Piece. Mallow accompanies Mario to Tadpole Pond so they can get advice from Frogfucius, Mallow's grandfather. He reveals that Mallow is not really a tadpole, and says Mallow should join Mario on a quest to find the seven Star Pieces as well as Mallow's real parents.

The duo travel to Rose Town where they meet a star spirit who has animated and taken control of a wooden doll named Geno. After battling the bow-like creature Bowyer, who is immobilizing residents of Rose Town with his arrows, they retrieve another Star Piece. Geno joins Mario and reveals to him the Star Piece is a part of the shattered Star Road, where he normally resides. Geno has been tasked with repairing Star Road and defeating Smithy, so that the world's wishes may again be heard. The trio eventually head to Booster Tower, the home of the eccentric amusement-venue owner, Booster, where they encounter Bowser, whose minions have all deserted him. Bowser reluctantly asks Mario to help him to reclaim his castle; Mario agrees, allowing Bowser to save face by pretending he is joining the Koopa Troop, and Bowser joins the party. The new team intercepts Princess Toadstool just before she is forcibly married to Booster, but it turns out that the wedding wasn't real; Booster, having no idea what a marriage actually is, just thought it was a fun party and abruptly returns home after devouring the cake.

After her rescue, the princess returns home to Mushroom Kingdom only to then decide to join the party while her grandmother takes her place in disguise. After gathering five star pieces, they search Nimbus Land. A statue maker informs them that Valentina has the rulers of Nimbus Land being held captive, and her sidekick Dodo is impersonating the prince. Dodo would make Valentina his queen. The statue maker recognizes Mallow as the true prince, then disguises Mario as a statue to infiltrate the castle. There they defeat Valentina and Dodo. The newly liberated king and queen, Mallow's parents, inform the group that they saw a star fall into the nearby volcano.

After traveling to Barrel Volcano to obtain the sixth Star Piece, Mario's party learns that the final piece must be held by Smithy in Bowser's castle. They battle their way through the assembled enemies to enter the castle, where they discover that Exor is actually a gateway to Smithy's factory, the place where Smithy mass-produces his army. Mario and company cross over, find the heart of the factory, and defeat Smithy, thereby stopping his army creation and causing Exor to disappear. The collected Star Pieces are used to repair the Star Road, Geno returns to the Star Road, Bowser rebuilds his castle with his newly reformed army, Mallow regains his rightful title as prince of Nimbus Land, and Mario and Princess Toadstool return to the Mushroom Kingdom to celebrate their victory.

Development 
According to Yoshio Hongo of Nintendo, Super Mario RPG came out of Shigeru Miyamoto's desire to make a RPG game using Mario, plus Square's desire to develop an RPG that could do better outside of Japan than their previous titles. Development began in early 1994 after a business meeting between Nintendo and Square. The first phase was spent on deciding a basic system, while the isometric view was chosen to help bring the world to life. To help the game fit with the Mario series, it was made to be more action- and movement-focused compared to Square's other RPGs. Development began in earnest during the second quarter of 1995, when the programming, story events, and graphics data were being implemented.

The game was officially unveiled by both Mario creator and producer Shigeru Miyamoto and co-director Chihiro Fujioka at the 1995 V-Jump Festival event in Japan. Miyamoto led teams at Nintendo and Square, who spent over a year developing the graphics. The story takes place in a newly rendered Mushroom Kingdom based on the Super Mario Bros. series. Square reported that the game was about 70% complete in October 1995. The developers created the interior elements such as columns, stairways, and exterior elements with advanced computer modeling techniques. Special lighting effects were used to create shadows and reflections that were meant to improve the 3D elements. Shinya Takahashi, who would later become head of Nintendo SPD and Nintendo EPD, designed the game's CG models. With guidance from Miyamoto, Square developed the game, combining role-playing aspects of previous Square games like Final Fantasy VI with the platforming elements of Nintendo's games. Square's Final Fantasy series was the model for the battle sequences, while the tradition of Super Mario Bros. games demanded a lot of action. Mario's ability to jog in eight directions and jump up or down in a three–quarter perspective gave him a (comparatively) large range of motion. At 70% completion, the mix of adventure and action gameplay elements placed it in a category closer to The Legend of Zelda: A Link to the Past.

When Nintendo of America received a 60% complete version in November, the staff were surprised at the inclusion of an RPG battle system. The battle screens, using pre-rendered sprites as in the rest of the game, included attack animations of equipped weapons. In December, further development and improvements to the gameplay delayed the translation of the game. For example, the Chancellor, who was named the Mushroom Retainer in Japan, was called the "Minister" in North America. Plans continued through February for the North American version, changing the release date forecast from winter to spring.

The game's soundtrack was composed by Yoko Shimomura, who incorporated arrangements by Koji Kondo from Super Mario Bros., and three tracks by Nobuo Uematsu from Final Fantasy IV. She regards the Super Mario RPG score as one of the turning points in her career as a composer. The music from the game was released as a two-disc soundtrack album in Japan by NTT Publishing on March 25, 1996, titled Super Mario RPG Original Sound Version.

Super Mario RPG: Legend of the Seven Stars is one of only seven SNES games released outside Japan to use the Nintendo SA-1 chip. Compared with standard SNES games, the additional microprocessor allows these features: higher clock speeds; faster access to the random-access memory (RAM); greater memory mapping capabilities, data storage, and compression; new direct memory access (DMA) modes, such as bitmap to bit plane transfer; and built-in CIC lockout for piracy protection and regional marketing control. It was not released in the PAL region; Nintendo representatives cited the need to optimize the game for PAL televisions and translate it into multiple languages.

Release 
Super Mario RPG became the last Super NES game released by Square in America, with Treasure of the Rudras and Treasure Hunter G as the last games released in Japan.

Super Mario RPG was released on Virtual Console for Wii in Japan on June 24, 2008. It was released for the first time in Europe and Australia on August 22, 2008 on Virtual Console for Wii, as part of the third Hanabi Festival (a period in which several games not previously available in Europe are released on the Wii's Virtual Console). It was released on Virtual Console for Wii in North America on September 1, 2008, with the distinction of being the 250th Virtual Console game released in that region. Super Mario RPG was released on Virtual Console for Wii U in Japan on August 5, 2015, in Europe and Australia on December 24, 2015, and in North America on June 30, 2016. It was also packed into the Super NES Classic Edition in 2017.

Reception 

Japanese audiences received Super Mario RPG well with 1.47 million copies sold, making it the third highest-selling game in Japan in 1996. Its sales in the United States surpassed Nintendo's expectations. For the game's release in the middle of May 1996, the company shipped 300,000 units to retailers; Nintendo estimated sell-through of more than 200,000 units within one month on shelves. A company representative said that "the title is on track to easily exceed our 500,000 target, and it may easily become a one million seller by the end of this calendar year". By August 24, it had been the most-rented game in the United States for 14 weeks straight. It went on to be the sixth best-selling video game of 1996 in the United States.

Super Mario RPG received positive reviews. Though various aspects of Super Mario RPG received mixed reviews, it garnered praise for its graphics and for humor in particular. Nintendo Powers review commented that the "excellent" 3D graphics helped the game appeal to a much wider audience than most traditional RPGs. In March 1997, Nintendo Power nominated the game for several awards, including "Best Graphics", in a player's choice contest, though Super Mario 64 won "Best Graphics". Electronic Gaming Monthly praised the graphics, stating that they are "the best seen on the Super NES". Scary Larry of GamePro gave the game a perfect 5/5 in all four categories (graphics, sound, control, and fun factor), and praised the rendered enemies, cinematics, and spell animations.

1UP.com stated that the graphic element is "strong enough to resemble a Mario title but still retains the role-playing theme at the same time", and Electronic Gaming Monthly commented that the visuals are "typical of Nintendo, using clean and colorful graphics along with nice animation". RPGamer editor Derek Cavin called the backgrounds "beautiful" and stated that they "perfectly bring the Mushroom Kingdom and surrounding areas into 3D". Skyler Miller from Allgame stated that the graphics are "absolutely outstanding, with colorful, 3D rendered visuals that once seemed impossible on the Super NES. This is definitely the high watermark for 3D graphics on any 16-bit system". The editor also called the music "quite extraordinary" and that the songs "match the mood of the surrounding environment". In the Virtual Console re-release, IGN's Lucas Thomas's review of Super Mario RPG stated that the game's experience "completes itself with a compelling story, a humorous attitude and a variety of interspersed mini-games that break up the adventuring action". The publication also stated that the soundtrack is "spectacular and a joy to listen to" and the graphics "took full advantage of the system's 16-bit technology and looks great".

Cavin said that most of the battle system mechanics "aren't very original" and also criticized the "lack of a unified storyline". In contrast, a reviewer for Next Generation found that the battle system refreshingly differed from tradition, and was pleased that "the elements that stand out from the traditional formula are those that make this a recognizable Mario game." He wrote that the gameplay was complex enough to challenge even veteran RPG gamers, yet simple enough to not alienate newcomers to the genre. Scary Larry similarly said the game "should please diehard RPG fans as well as novice players", as it is genuinely tough and offers considerable replay value in the form of sidequests and bonus features such as Toadofsky's music levels. He also found Squaresoft's signature humor and puzzle-solving to be as exceptional as usual. Miller commented that after engaging in many battles, "the battle music becomes monotonous" and that after the game is beaten, "There aren't any surprises to be discovered the second time around". While 1UP.com stated that "The characters seem too childish for older gamers", Next Generation said the game is "held together by the strength of its characters and well-developed world."

In 2009, Official Nintendo Magazine ranked the game 34th on a list of greatest Nintendo games. Electronic Gaming Monthly editors named Super Mario RPG a runner-up for both Super NES Game of the Year (behind Tetris Attack) and Role-Playing Game of the Year (behind Blood Omen: Legacy of Kain). In 2018, Complex ranked the game 8th on their "The Best Super Nintendo Games of All Time." In 2023, Time Extension included the game on their "Best JRPGs of All Time" list.

Legacy 
Super Mario RPG received positive reviews and appeared on reader-selected "best game of all time" lists, such as 30th at IGN, and critic-selected "best games of all time" lists, such as 26th in Electronic Gaming Monthly.

Super Mario RPG does not have a direct sequel but it established conventions for its thematic and spiritual successors, the Paper Mario series and Mario & Luigi series. Nintendo originally announced a game titled Super Mario RPG 2 for 64DD, which was renamed to Paper Mario before its release on the Nintendo 64. Themes shared with the original include the use of Flower Points as a shared party resource instead of each character having their own pool of Magic Points, timed action commands during battles, and the collection of seven stars.

Both Fujioka and Maekawa went on to work at AlphaDream, having a hands-on involvement with almost every single entry in the Mario & Luigi series. Yoko Shimomura returned as well, having composed the soundtrack for every title. Mario & Luigi: Superstar Saga features a cameo of Geno in one of the minigames, and the end credits mention Square Enix as the copyright holder of the character; this cameo was removed for the game's Nintendo 3DS remake. After accumulating a massive debt by March 2018, AlphaDream would file for bankruptcy in October 2019, leaving the future of the Mario & Luigi series in limbo.

Various locations and characters from the game appear in the children's book Mario and the Incredible Rescue released by Scholastic in 2006. Though his only starring role in a video game was in Super Mario RPG, Masahiro Sakurai added the fan-favorite character Geno as a Mii Fighter costume to the crossover fighting game series Super Smash Bros. as paid DLC, attributing his inclusion to his matching arm cannon. Super Mario RPG is among the 21 preinstalled games on the Super NES Classic Edition in all regions, released in September 2017.

Notes

References

External links 

1996 video games
Mario role-playing games
Square (video game company) games
Super Nintendo Entertainment System games
Video games developed in Japan
Video games scored by Yoko Shimomura
Video games with isometric graphics
Video games with pre-rendered 3D graphics
Virtual Console games for Wii
Virtual Console games for Wii U
Single-player video games